In optics, Lambert's cosine law says that the radiant intensity or luminous intensity observed from an ideal diffusely reflecting surface or ideal diffuse radiator is directly proportional to the cosine of the angle θ between the observer's line of sight and the surface normal; . The law is also known as the cosine emission law  or Lambert's emission law. It is named after Johann Heinrich Lambert, from his Photometria, published in 1760.

A surface which obeys Lambert's law is said to be Lambertian, and exhibits Lambertian reflectance. Such a surface has the same radiance/luminance when viewed from any angle. This means, for example, that to the human eye it has the same apparent brightness. It has the same radiance because, although the emitted power from a given area element is reduced by the cosine of the emission angle, the solid angle, subtended by surface visible to the viewer, is reduced by the very same amount. Because the ratio between power and solid angle is constant, radiance (power per unit solid angle per unit projected source area) stays the same.

Lambertian scatterers and radiators

When an area element is radiating as a result of being illuminated by an external source, the irradiance (energy or photons /time/area) landing on that area element will be proportional to the cosine of the angle between the illuminating source and the normal. A Lambertian scatterer will then scatter this light according to the same cosine law as a Lambertian emitter. This means that although the radiance of the surface depends on the angle from the normal to the illuminating source, it will not depend on the angle from the normal to the observer. For example, if the moon were a Lambertian scatterer, one would expect to see its scattered brightness appreciably diminish towards the terminator due to the increased angle at which sunlight hit the surface. The fact that it does not diminish illustrates that the moon is not a Lambertian scatterer, and in fact tends to scatter more light into the oblique angles than a Lambertian scatterer.

The emission of a Lambertian radiator does not depend on the amount of incident radiation, but rather from radiation originating in the emitting body itself. For example, if the sun were a Lambertian radiator, one would expect to see a constant brightness across the entire solar disc. The fact that the sun exhibits limb darkening in the visible region illustrates that it is not a Lambertian radiator. A black body is an example of a Lambertian radiator.

Details of equal brightness effect

The situation for a Lambertian surface (emitting or scattering) is illustrated in Figures 1 and 2.  For conceptual clarity we will think in terms of photons rather than energy or luminous energy. The wedges in the circle each represent an equal angle dΩ, of an arbitrarily chosen size, and for a Lambertian surface, the number of photons per second emitted into each wedge is proportional to the area of the wedge.

The length of each wedge is the product of the diameter of the circle and cos(θ). The maximum rate of photon emission per unit solid angle is along the normal, and diminishes to zero for θ = 90°.

Figure 2 represents what an observer sees. The observer directly above the area element will be seeing the scene through an aperture of area dA0 and the area element dA will subtend a (solid) angle of dΩ0, which is a portion of the observer's total angular field-of-view of the scene. Since the wedge size dΩ was chosen arbitrarily, for convenience we may assume without loss of generality that it coincides with the solid angle subtended by the aperture when "viewed" from the locus of the emitting area element dA. Thus the normal observer will then be recording the same  photons per second emission derived above and will measure a radiance of

  photons/(s·m2·sr).

The observer at angle θ to the normal will be seeing the scene through the same aperture of area dA0 (still corresponding to a dΩ wedge) and from this oblique vantage the area element dA is foreshortened and will subtend a (solid) angle of dΩ0 cos(θ).  This observer will be recording  photons per second, and so will be measuring a radiance of

  photons/(s·m2·sr),

which is the same as the normal observer.

Relating peak luminous intensity and luminous flux 

In general, the luminous intensity of a point on a surface varies by direction; for a Lambertian surface, that distribution is defined by the cosine law, with peak luminous intensity in the normal direction. Thus when the Lambertian assumption holds, we can calculate the total luminous flux, from the peak luminous intensity, by integrating the cosine law:

and so

where  is the determinant of the Jacobian matrix for the unit sphere, and realizing that  is luminous flux per steradian. Similarly, the peak intensity will be  of the total radiated luminous flux. For Lambertian surfaces, the same factor of  relates luminance to luminous emittance, radiant intensity to radiant flux, and radiance to radiant emittance. Radians and steradians are, of course, dimensionless and so "rad" and "sr" are included only for clarity.

Example: A surface with a luminance of say 100 cd/m2 (= 100 nits, typical PC monitor) will, if it is a perfect Lambert emitter, have a luminous emittance of 100π lm/m2. If its area is 0.1 m2 (~19" monitor) then the total light emitted, or luminous flux, would thus be 31.4 lm.

See also
 Transmittance
 Reflectivity
 Passive solar building design
 Sun path

References 

Radiometry
Photometry
3D computer graphics
Scattering